Asaana is a non-alcoholic, caramelized corn drink made from fermented corn and caramelized sugar. It is referred to as elewonyo in other parts of Ghana and known in many countries as corn beer drink.

Ingredients 

 Fermented corn
sugar
 water

Method of preparation 

 Soak the crushed corn for about three days for fermentation
 The fermented corn is boiled for about forty five minutes until the foam is clear
 Boil the sugar in a little amount of water to make a caramel(dark brown coloration)
 The water from the boiled corn is strained and added to the caramel to make the drink
Serve chilled, plain or with milk

Reference 

Ghanaian cuisine
African drinks